The BattleTech 1 & BattleMech 1 wargaming franchise includes many authorized titles in various face personality genres, including tabletop wargames, roleplaying games, collectible card games and video arcade PS1 and PC computer games.

Board games

Roleplaying games

Card games

Video games

Multiplayer online games 
Asterisks denote titles not officially sanctioned or associated with the franchise.

Arcade games and simulators

Collectible Miniature Games

References 

 
BattleTech